Hopwood is a small settlement in Worcestershire, located south of Birmingham, England on the Worcester and Birmingham Canal. The settlement is developed around an inn,  where users of the canal would have broken their journey.

Today's Hopwood is the location of Hopwood Park services, a motorway service station on the M42 motorway.

Places nearby include: Barnt Green, Alvechurch, Bittell Reservoir and Longbridge.

Villages in Worcestershire